Dominika Horňáková (born 1 February 1991) is a Slovak handball player for IUVENTA Michalovce and the Slovak national team.

References

1991 births
Living people
Slovak female handball players
People from Michalovce
Sportspeople from the Košice Region